"Thinkin' of a Rendezvous" is a country music song written by Bobby Braddock and Sonny Throckmorton, and recorded by Johnny Duncan.

Featuring harmony vocals, and a solo line at a key point in the song's third verse by session vocalist Janie Fricke, "Thinkin' of a Rendezvous" was Duncan's first number-one song on the Billboard Hot Country Singles chart in December 1976. A two-week run atop the country chart was part of a 13-week stay in the country chart's top 40.

The song — about a family man who meets up with a woman, a long-time friend with whom he had a secret affair a year earlier — was the first of two Duncan-Fricke duets to top the charts. The follow-up song, "It Couldn't Have Been Any Better", went number one in April 1977, and the two enjoyed several other duet hits, most notably "Stranger" (written by Kris Kristofferson, and a hit in July 1976) and "Come a Little Bit Closer" in January 1978 (a cover of the Jay and the Americans).

Charts

Weekly charts

Year-end charts

References

1976 singles
Johnny Duncan (country singer) songs
Songs written by Bobby Braddock
Songs written by Sonny Throckmorton
Song recordings produced by Billy Sherrill
1976 songs
Columbia Records singles